Maureen Boyle (born 1961) is a Northern Irish poet.

Biography 
Maureen Boyle was born and raised near Strabane in County Tyrone, Northern Ireland.  She studied English at Trinity College, Dublin, graduating B.A in 1984.  Her poems have been published in Fortnight Magazine, The Yellow Nib, and elsewhere. She is married to the Belfast journalist and writer Malachi O'Doherty. She teaches at St Dominic's Grammar School for Girls in Belfast.

Awards 

  Her poem "Weather Vane" won the Strokestown International Poetry Competition in 2007
  She was the recipient in 2007 of the Ireland Chair of Poetry Prize for an emergent poet.
  She was a runnerup for the Patrick Kavanagh Poetry Award in 2004.

References

External links
Maureen Boyle reads poetry on PoetCasting
 How come Northern Ireland has the best poets?
 Strokestown International Poetry Festival 2007
 Maureen Boyle, The 2004 2nd Place Patrick Kavanagh Poetry Award Winner
 Maureen Boyle, The 2000 2nd Place Winner (English) of the International Poetry Competition
 Maureen Boyle at William Carleton Summer School

1961 births
Living people
People from County Tyrone
Women poets from Northern Ireland
21st-century writers from Northern Ireland
21st-century poets from Northern Ireland
21st-century women writers from Northern Ireland